Electra was a British electronic-music band, founded in the late 1980s by Paul Oakenfold in close collaboration with his friend Steve Osborne.

The band was made up of Oakenfold, Osborne, Nick Divaris,Johny 
Rocca and Micky. It released three EPs. The first one, "Jibaro", was an unacknowledged cover version of a rare Latin-funk song originally composed and recorded by Elkin & Nelson, a Colombian act based in Spain in the 1970s, which was a part of the original "Balearic beat" of the late 1980s.

Discography

EPs
1988: "Jibaro" (reached number 54 on the UK Singles Chart)
1989: "Destiny" / "Autumn Love" (double A side single, reached number 51 on the UK Singles Chart)

References

Musical groups with year of establishment missing
Musical groups with year of disestablishment missing
1980s establishments in the United Kingdom
1990s disestablishments in the United Kingdom
British electronic music groups
Musical groups established in the 1980s
Musical groups disestablished in the 1990s
FFRR Records artists
London Records artists